Global Winter Wonderland is a multicultural lantern festival produced by the International Culture Exchange Group. The festival made its US debut in Santa Clara, California on November 25, 2011, and drew nearly 500,000 people by the end of its run in early January 2012. Five more Global Winter Wonderland festivals followed. In 2012 Global Winter Wonderland was held again in Santa Clara, CA. In 2013 it moved to Atlanta, Georgia and in 2014 and 2015 it was held in Sacramento, California. In 2015, ICEG also produced Global Winter Wonderland in Tulare, CA – making it the first year to produce two events at exactly the same time.

The Global Winter Wonderland Festival is based on the Chinese Lantern Festival. It has distinction of being the largest lantern festival of its kind outside of China. This event enables patrons to “Travel the World in One Night” by viewing large replicas of the world's most famous landmarks such as India's Taj Mahal, Paris’ Eiffel Tower, Mexico's Chichen Itza, San Francisco's Golden Gate Bridge and more! Global Winter Wonderland's magnificent towering lanterns, some of which soar to over 50 feet high and 100 feet long, are built by Chinese engineers with modern technology. These lanterns even reflect the trendy green thinking of today, with their eco-friendly features of low voltage LEDS, fluorescent lights, and solar paneling. These elaborate lantern displays are built by the engineers of several structures showcased in the 2008 Beijing Paralympic Games. They are then shipped to the venue of the event and competed over 6 weeks prior the events start date.

History of Lanterns
The modern lanterns gracing the night skies of Global Winter Wonderland have a history that tracks back over two thousand years to ancient China. Paper lanterns originated from as far back as the Eastern Han Dynasty (25 AD – 220 AD) and were used as lamps, especially in entry ways of homes. The lantern shade was practical in that it protected the flame from being extinguished in windy weather. Lanterns were most often made from paper and silk but could be made from various kinds of materials such as bamboo, wood, wheat-straw and metal. The traditional Chinese lantern is one that is red in color.

Chinese monks used lanterns on the twelfth day of the first lunar moon to worship Buddha. During the Eastern Han Dynasty, the Emperor, Liu Zhuang, was a Buddhist and ordered his citizenry to light lanterns to worship Buddha as the monks did. Eventually, this lantern lighting became a grand festival among the common people. During the Tang Dynasty (618 AD – 907 AD), lanterns symbolized and celebrated the prosperity, strength and power of China. From then on, lighting lanterns became popular throughout the entire country.

Over the years, lanterns became an object of artistic expression, ornamentation and a major status symbol. Common to ancient Chinese society was its fondness for grand celebration, including the Lantern Festival, aka Little New Year, named because it is the culmination of the Chinese New Year festival. The lantern festival was where artisans competed among themselves to produce the most beautifully designed, elaborated and exquisite lantern.  The emperor of China himself would hire the best lantern designers to work for him, a position which was considered to be a high honor.

Today, lanterns have evolved to become less practical but more as a means of artistic expression. More types of lanterns appear in festivals now than the traditional red Chinese ones. Modern technology is being used to make the lanterns, such as the ones at Global Winter Wonderland. Lanterns can be made with music playing from them, with control panels to make them light up in various ways and times, and so forth. The shapes of modern lanterns have changed over time too. The lanterns can be created into cartoon characters, Chinese zodiac animals and architectural landmarks, such as the ones featured at Global Winter Wonderland.

Event History

2011 - Santa Clara, CA - Great America Parking Lot - "Travel the World in Just One Day!" 
Traditional Chinese lanterns are showcased in the United States for the first time at International Culture Exchange Group's debut of Global Winter Wonderland! The event is centered around the traditional lanterns and also features multi-cultural entertainment, rides and games, international food and holiday shopping for the whole family!

2011 Highlights:

 San Francisco declares February 6, 2012 as “Chinese Lantern Day”.
 Bollywood Day and Hispanic Day feature cultural entertainment.
 Francisco 49ers Day to welcome their foundation, players and coaches.
 Lanterns made with recycled items – medicine bottles for the Phoenix Vase, CDs for the Dragon Boat, porcelain teacups, spoons and plates to make a Dragon and Phoenix

2012 - Santa Clara, CA - Inside Great America Theme Park - "Holiday Fun for Everyone!" 
Global Winter Wonderland returns to Santa Clara and has moved inside the Great America Theme Park! Guests were able to enjoy the thrilling rides at Great America, plus a new theme, new lanterns and added entertainment!

2012 Highlights:

 City of Mountain View, CA declares a November 25, 2012 Chinese Lantern Day.
 Rudolph and Hermey Costumed Characters.
 Laser Light Show and a Traditional Peking Opera, “Monkey King” – Shows every night!
 Vietnamese Day, India Day, Hispanic Day and Chinese Day feature cultural entertainment.
 Global Winter Wonderland debuts its popular Dinosaur Maze.
 Two traditional Chinese Dragon lanterns over 100 feet long are a main attraction!

2013 - Atlanta, GA – Turner Field - "Travel the World in Just One Day!" 
Global Winter Wonderland travels across the country! With a new venue, Global Winter Wonderland brought the iconic landmark lanterns to the residents of Atlanta, GA. 2013 also featured new lanterns and tons of entertainment.
2013 Highlights:

 UniverSoul Circus performs every night featuring aerial acrobats and motorcycle cage riding.
 Musical performances by B5, Keri Hilson, Coco Jones, Jamie-Grace and Montel Jordan.
 Traditional Chinese Folk Art on display and for purchase.
 Appearances by cast members of Real Housewives of Atlanta and Love and Hip Hop Atlanta.
 Debut of the Global Village Tree lantern as well as Mount Rushmore and the Martin Luther King, Jr. Monument.

2014 - Sacramento, CA – Cal Expo - "Travel the World in One Night!" 
Global Winter Wonderland returns to California and is hosted at Cal Expo in one of the most diverse cities in the United States – Sacramento. Spanning over 17 acres, Global Winter Wonderland invited guests to "Travel the World in One Night" and enjoy over 30 thrilling rides, entertainment from local communities and the event's very own circus!
2014 Highlights:

 Debut of Global Winter Wonderland's Circus of Light featuring circus acts from around the world. 
 Four multi-cultural parades featuring local and global participants.
 Cultural Theme Days – Asian Pacific Islander, Hispanic, Slavic, Shah Jahan Night, African American Day.
 Performances by Jana Kramer, Cimorelli and Pete Escovedo, Jr. .
 Unique oil paintings from the region of Darfen in China are on display – and for sale!
 Special days to host local sports teams Sacramento Kings (NBA), Sacramento Rivercats (PCL), and Sacramento Republic (MLS).

2015 - Sacramento, CA - Cal Expo and Tulare, CA - Tulare County Fair 
For the first time, ICEG produces Global Winter Wonderland in two locations!  The event returned to Cal Expo in Sacramento, CA and was hosted by the Tulare County Fairgrounds in Tulare, CA. The Tulare event showcased landmarks from around the world and featured a revamped Circus of Light.  The Sacramento event featured a whole new theme, ALL new lanterns as well as new entertainment and activities!

2015 Highlights:

Sacramento, CA - "Magic of the Seasons"
 Circus of Light presents Acrobats on Ice – First time in the U.S.
 Golden 1 Holiday Ice Rink for public ice skating!
 All NEW lanterns including a 42-foot tall Beehive constructed of recycled medicine bottles!
 Multi-cultural parades every Saturday and Sunday featuring local and global participants.
Tulare, CA - "Travel the World in One Night"
 Lanterns of iconic landmarks from around the world including St. Basil's Cathedral and the Eiffel Tower.
 Circus of Light performs with acts from Africa, Russia and Argentina.

2016 - Sacramento, CA - Cal Expo and Tulare, CA - Tulare County Fair 

Global Winter Wonderland returns!  After successful events in Sacramento and Tulare in 2015, ICEG brings back Global Winter Wonderland to Sacramento and Tulare for the 2016 holiday season.  Both locations introduced our new mascot, Penny the Penguin! Sacramento's brand new theme brought larger-than-life displays of Santa's Village, Candy Land, Snow Land, Toy Land and more.  Tulare featured the "Magic of the Seasons" displays and also showcased new entertainment and activities.

2016 Highlights:

Sacramento, CA - "Holiday Fun for Everyone"
 Circus of Light returns with new acts from around the world!
 All NEW dazzling light displays featuring magical, holiday lands such as the Candy Forest and Toy Kingdom.
 Holiday Ice Rink and Arctic Snow Maze for guests of all ages!
 First-ever, indoor glow-in-the-dark activity center & under the sea indoor light display.
Tulare, CA - "Magic of the Seasons"
 All NEW lanterns representing all four seasons, dinosaurs, the animal kingdom and international landmarks. 
 Circus of Light returns with all new acts from Africa and China.

2017 - Sacramento, CA - Cal Expo and San Diego, CA - SDCCU Stadium 

Global Winter Wonderland returns to Sacramento for its 4th season and makes its debut in San Diego!  Through our renowned lantern displays that featured iconic buildings and landmarks around the globe, guests were invited to experience "Holidays Around the World."  At both locations, new displays, activities, and entertainment provided guests an immersive celebration of different cultures' holidays.  Global Winter Wonderland also provided brand-new, daring entertainment in Sacramento and San Diego, with the Motorcycle Globe (up to 5 riders at one time!), Tight-Wire, and Wheel of Death acts!

2017 Highlights:

Sacramento, CA - "Holidays Around the World"
 Circus of Light returns with exciting, new acts from around the world, including Africa, China, and the Polynesian islands.
 All NEW lantern displays, including Egyptian Pharaohs and Pyramids, Brazilian Carnival Dancers, and the Arc de Triomphe and Parthenon.
 Fun activities for kids and adults: Safari Maze, Holiday Ice Rink, Glow-in-the-Dark play room, and over 30 thrilling carnival rides. 
 PLUS! Penny the Penguin and Santa made return appearances! 
San Diego, CA - "Holidays Around the World"
 Stunning lantern displays, representing 5 South American countries as well as Greece, Vietnam, Thailand, France and Egypt. 
 Circus of Light made its San Diego debut with fire dancing, juggling, and hoop diving with performers from around the world! 
 Penny the Penguin and Santa visit and local food trucks made appearances with international cuisine.

Activities
Global Winter Wonderland features large lantern replicas of a selection of the world's most famous landmarks such as the Eiffel Tower in Paris, China's Temple of Heaven, San Francisco's Golden Gate Bridge and many more!

The festival also features The Circus of Light with various circus acts from around the world. This performance incorporates multiple cultures showcasing their talents and entertainment. World famous flying acrobats, jugglers, fire dancers and contortionists are just a few of the acts featured in Global Winter Wonderlands Circus of Light.

Throughout the run of each Global Winter Wonderland a number of Theme Days are incorporated while the event is open. Past theme days have highlighted some of the many cultures from the city in which the event is being held that year. Hispanic Day, Asian Pacific Islander Day, Slavic Day and Anime Costume Day are just a few examples of the past Theme Days held at Global Winter Wonderland.

A Global Food Pavilion brings foods from around the world to one place. Global Winter Wonderland offers guests the chance to indulge in delicious and exotic dishes inspired from around the world without having to leave the country. For guests 21 and older, there is also a full bar with unique imported beers and wines from around the globe!

Rides and games are featured at Global Winter Wonderland for guests to enjoy. There is something for everyone with over 30 rides including favorites like the tea cups and a carousel. Guests can even experience all of the lights from above on the Ferris Wheel!

References

www.GlobalWonderland.com
www.CultureExchange.us

External links
 Global Winter Wonderland

November events
December events
January events
Winter festivals